(also known as Nimra Ahmed or Nemrah Niazi) is a Pakistani novelist۔. She is the CEO of "Zanjabeel". Her first novel was published in Khwateen Digest.

Books
She has written several books in Urdu:
Meray Khwaab Meray Jugnoo / میرے خواب میرے جگنو 
Sans Sakin Thi / سانس ساکن تھی
Pahari Ka Qaidi پہاڑی کا قیدی
Mushaf (2011), a novel, also published in India
Jannat Kay Pattay / جنت کے پتے Year 2012
Namal / نمل Year 2014
Karakoram ka Taj Mahal 
Haalim / حالم . Year 2016
Beli Rajputan ki Malika
Woh Mera Hai / وہ میرا ہے
Paras / پارس
Iblees / ابلیس
Mai Anmol/میں انمول
Maala/ مالا Year 2022 (Ongoing)

References

Pakistani women writers
Urdu-language novelists
Pakistani novelists
Living people
1980 births